Lawrence "Larry" Snow Damon (born December 8, 1933) is a retired American cross-country skier and biathlete who competed in the 1956, 1960, 1964 and 1968 Olympics.

Early years 
Born December 8, 1933 in Burlington, Vermont, Damon attended Burlington High School where he was a four event skier.

Career 
 1951 won the State Slalom Championship and placed second in the Cross-country Championship.
 1952–1955 won the first NCAA Cross-country Ski Championship for UVM.
 1956 placed 51st in the 15 km cross-country ski at the 1956 Olympics and Men's 4x10 km Cross-country Ski Relay, ranked 12th with personal time in the 3rd leg of 0:37:27 and total team time of 2:32:04.  Relay teammates were Ted Farwell, Mack Miller and Marvin Crawford.
 1958–1959 Competes for the US Military Biathlon teams.
 1959 won pre-Olympic North American Biathlon.
 1960 placed 24th in the 20 km biathlon at the 1960 Olympics.
 1961 won US Championships in 15 km Cross-country Ski and 30 km Cross-country Ski.
 1962 finished 10th in the 1962 Boston Marathon with a time of 2:34:05.
 1964 placed 46th in the 30 km  and 28th in the 50 km cross-country Ski at the 1964 Olympics..
 1968 placed 55th in the 15 km and 32nd in the 50 km Cross-country ski at the 1968 Olympics.

Publicity press and promotions 
Damon was inducted into the Vermont Ski and Snowboard Museum Hall of Fame in 2010.

Personal life 
Damon graduated from the University of Vermont in 1955. After the 1956 Olympics, he joined the U.S. Army where he competed in biathlon. After marrying Norwegian Olympic cross-country skier Babben Enger he briefly lived in Norway, but in 1970 settled in Vermont to work as a ski instructor at the Trapp Family Lodge.

References

1933 births
Living people
American male cross-country skiers
American male biathletes
Olympic cross-country skiers of the United States
Olympic biathletes of the United States
Cross-country skiers at the 1956 Winter Olympics
Biathletes at the 1960 Winter Olympics
Cross-country skiers at the 1964 Winter Olympics
Cross-country skiers at the 1968 Winter Olympics
Vermont Catamounts skiers
Sportspeople from Vermont
University of Vermont alumni
Burlington High School (Vermont) alumni